Yaga Gathering is a transformational festival hosted in a clearing in Ežeraitis Forest, at the edge of Spengla Lake in the Varėna District of southern Lithuania. The festival has no corporate sponsors, and is financed by ticket sales.

DJs and live bands from various countries perform on four music stages: the Valley stage, the Pinegrove stage, The Duskwood stage and the Outmost stage. Classes and activities are among the festival's other attractions, including open-air cinema, the Discovery stage featuring lectures, Healing area with yoga and meditation sessions, handicraft workshops area, and a children's area. The design of the event space incorporates art installations and exhibits. Most of the festival infrastructure is built using biodegradable materials. Attendees are permitted to camp on-site.

History

Initially, Yaga Gathering was called Shambala Festival—named for the mythical hidden kingdom of Shambhala. The first event took place from 18 to 20 July 2003; it was small (250 attendees) and not widely advertised. Organisers produced a second festival in 2005, and the third festival in 2006. In 2007 the festival was renamed as Yaga Gathering. Between years 2007 and 2019 there was no Yaga Festival in 2008 or 2010.

In Vedic tradition, a yaga is a ritual performed in front of a sacred fire, or one in which an offering is burned in a fire. The festival's name alludes to spiritual rebirth.

See also

 Counterculture
 Goa trance
Yaga

References

External links

 

Festivals in Lithuania
Transformational festivals
Counterculture festivals
Hippie movement
Trance festivals
Electronic music festivals in Lithuania
Jam band festivals